Bianca Buitendag is a South African professional surfer. She has represented South Africa at the 2020 Summer Olympics where she won silver in the women's shortboard competition.

Life
Buitendag was born in George, Western Cape, South Africa on 9 November 1993. She grew up near the beach of False Bay outside of Cape Town.  With her father's encouragement she learned to surf at the age of eight with her two brothers.  When she was twelve her family moved to the Southern Cape region of South Africa.  Bianca only spoke Afrikaans when she first went to school, so her parents decided to put her in an English school.

In 2015 her father, Collin Buitendag, died. She was still able to finish at her career-best at World No. 4. The following year she was ranked No 12 in the world.

Surfing career highlights
2013 8th ranked WSL
2013 3rd Colgate Plax Girl's Rio Pro – Brazil
2014 7th ranked WSL
2014 3rd Target Women's Maui Pro – Hawaii
2014 2nd Roxy Pro Gold Coast – Australia
2015 4th ranked WSL
2015 2nd Swatch Women's Pro – California
2015 3rd Van's US Open of Surfing – California
2015 2nd Fiji Women's Pro – Fiji
2015 2nd IO Rio Women's Pro – Brazil
2016 12th ranked WSL
2017 17th ranked WSL 
2018 3rd Corona J Bay – Africa
2019 44th ranked WSL
2021 2nd (silver medal) 2020 Summer Olympic Games

References

External links
Profile in World Surf League
Personal Site
Surfer Girls - Bianca Buitendag

Living people
1993 births
People from George, South Africa
South African female surfers
World Surf League surfers
Olympic surfers of South Africa
Surfers at the 2020 Summer Olympics
Olympic silver medalists for South Africa
Medalists at the 2020 Summer Olympics
Olympic medalists in surfing
Afrikaner people
Sportspeople from the Western Cape